The scaly-bellied woodpecker (Picus squamatus) is a species of bird in the family Picidae. It is found in the Indian subcontinent and adjoining regions, ranging across Afghanistan, Iran, India, Nepal, Pakistan, and Turkmenistan.

Habitat
Its natural habitats are boreal forests, temperate forests, and subtropical or tropical moist lowland forests.

Description
Large, green woodpecker with distinct scaling from breast to vent. Similar to streak-throated woodpecker but larger and with unstreaked throat and upper breast. Black moustache and black bored white supercilia. Tail strongly barred. Crown red in male, blackish in female. Large pale bill.

References

scaly-bellied woodpecker
Birds of Afghanistan
Birds of North India
Birds of Nepal
Birds of Pakistan
scaly-bellied woodpecker
Taxonomy articles created by Polbot